Keith Frazier is one of the founding members of Rebirth Brass Band.  In the band, Frazier plays the bass drum with a cymbal mounted on top.  He plays the drum with one hand and the cymbal with the other, using a flathead screwdriver.

Keith Frazier and his brother, Phillip Frazier (the group's sousaphone/tuba player), formed Rebirth Brass Band along with other band members they met at Joseph S. Clark Sr. High School in New Orleans, including renowned trumpeter, Kermit Ruffins. In Joseph S. Clark's marching and concert bands, Frazier played several brass instruments and was section leader of the baritones.

Rebirth Brass Band,  was discovered at the 1982 New Orleans Jazz & Heritage Festival and recorded its first studio album in 1984.

See also 
 Rebirth Brass Band
 HBO's Treme TV Series

References

External links 
Keith Frazier Interview - Metromix article by Matt Wake
Rebirth Brass Band website
Rebirth Turns 25, Paste Magazine article by Caroline Goyette

Year of birth missing (living people)
Living people
Musicians from New Orleans
American percussionists
Rebirth Brass Band members